The Premios Tu Mundo for Your Favorite Lead Actor,  is a category created by Premios Tu Mundo, presented by Telemundo, to choose the best favorite actor of telenovelas. So far the only actor, who has won this award consecutively was Jencarlos Canela. In 2014, the actor Rafael Amaya won.

Winners and nominees

Novelas

Súper series (2015–16)

References 

Television awards for Best Actor
Awards established in 2012